Angeline Malik is a Pakistani director, actor, producer, model, television host and activist.

Angeline Malik is a multifaceted personality an actor, producer, director, sculptor and an advocate of raising and voicing relevant social issues. She is known for her selection of diverse characters and subjects, with the boom of private channels where everyone else was concentrating on commercial projects influenced by Indian content she created a niche for herself by choosing subjects related to women empowerment and issues, highlighted upon child abuse way before people realized it was an issue to be talked about. In a span of two decades from the longest running series in Pakistan Kitni Girhain Baqi Hain based on women empowerment, which was also aired on the Indian channel Zindagi, to ambulance a series based on health and doctors, to courtroom a series highlighting upon real cases and educating people on their legal rights, to mujhay jeenay do, a project in collaboration with Johns Hopkins University on child marriage and honour killing.

She is the founder of movement #inkaarkaro which is a campaign aimed towards educating and empowering women, men and children,  it is an initiative to voice different social issues. It is the first of a series of movements that will creatively depict strong women and men coming together to raise their voice against harassment, domestic violence, child abuse or any other form of abuse one is not comfortable with. She has previously talked on the above subjects to create awareness on a local and international level at TEDx, Lincoln corner in association with US Consulate, APPNA and WAPNA conference.

She is also the driving force behind #mujhayjeenaydo #meriawaazauno a campaign which has mobilized both celebrities and influencers to bring about change in the legislations for the protection of victims of child abuse. Her outspoken stance on these issues has brought her a large following in the enlightened section of society but at the same time has also brought about a strong reaction from conservatives who wish to maintain their status quo.

Malik won the Lux Style Awards in 2006 for best director and a nomination for best actress.  She is also famous for the first coming-of-age talk show Black and White on Indus Vision and for her selection of diverse characters. Her name comes in the top directors of Pakistan working in this field since 2002. She is also known as a producer, working under the banner of Angelic Films.

On arriving from London with a degree in Computer Imaging and Animation, Malik entered in the fashion and showbiz world in 2002, Since then Angeline Malik is continuously establishing her name by working hard in various fields. Other than showing her guts on the fashion ramps as a celebrity model, Malik has also proved herself as a producer, director, and as an anchor. Malik has performed diverse types of characters in many T.V dramas, on different channels. Malik is very touchy and selective about the projects she adopts for direction mainly focusing on deep issues rooted in our society. She has created a name for herself in an industry that is mostly male dominated through the roles she has played and the subjects she has chosen.

Early life
Malik has one elder brother and sister, Dr. Arshad Khan Malik and Amberine Khan, residing in Islamabad with her mother, Anees Khan Malik and a younger sister Alvera Khan residing in Europe. Her father has died an ophthalmologist and professor known for his humanitarian and charity work Professor M Aslam Khan Malik. She resides in Karachi.

Malik spent her initial childhood in England and then shifted to Islamabad. She Malik completed her master's degree in fine arts, particularly in sculpture; for further studies she went to London, to secure her another master's degree in computer imaging and animation from London Guildhall University.

Filmography

As a director
Mystery Theatre series 2002–2004. Indus Media Group
 Ambulance series 2003–2004 Indus Media Group
 "Sayyad" telefilm 2004 AAJ TV
 "Jantay Jantay" telefilm 2005 Ary Digital
 Lahasil drama serial 2005 Hum TV
 "Aur Pyar Ho Gya" telefilm 2005 TVOne Global
 "Lillian" telefilm 2005 TVOne Global
 Lala Ki Film telefilm 2006 TVOne Global
 "Har khwahish pay dum Niklay" telefilm 2006 TVOne Global
 "Oh Farzana" telefilm 2006. Ary Digital
 "Dil Ki Madham Bolian" music video 2006 TVOne Global
 "Meri Awaaz" telefilm 2007 TVOne Global
 "The End" telefilm 2008 ARY Digital
 "Lateefa" telefilm 2008 ARY Digital
 Rani by Angeline Malik drama serial 2008. Pakistan Television Corporation
 "Dil Hai Chota Sa" drama serial 2009 Geo TV
 "Muni Badnaam Hoi" Hum TV telefilm 2010
 "Woh Chaar" series 2010–2011 Hum TV
 "Run Zoella Run" telefilm 2010 ARY Digital
 "Piano Girl" telefilm 2010 Hum TV
 "Shinakht" 23 March special telefilm 2012 Hum TV
 "Raja Banay Batein" telefilm 2012 Hum TV
 "Ghar Aay Mehman" telefilm 2012 Hum TV
 "Mehboob Movie walla" telefilm 2012 Hum TV
 "Dil Vallay Voti Lay Jain Gay" telefilm 2012 Hum TV
 "Mamma keh Mian" telefilm 2012 Express Entertainment
 "Kitni Girhain Baqi Hain" TV series Hum TV 2011-2014 113 episodes
 "Susral Keh Rang Anokhay" TV series Hum TV 2012-2013
 "Kitni Girhain Baqi Hain" TV series Zee Zindagi 2011-to present
 "Aisa Jalay Jia" serial Hum TV 2013
 "Sirf Tum" Valentine's Day special tele-film Hum TV 2013
 "Aisa Dais Hay Mera" 23rd march special tele-film Hum TV 2013
 "Woh" Horror Serial Hum TV 2013
 "Thora pya Zyada love" Valentine's Day special tele-film Hum TV 2014
 "Percham Pyar Ka" 23rd march special tele-film Hum TV 2014
 "Woh Dubarah" Second season of Woh horror serialHum TV 2014
 "Chupkay Chupkay" eid day special tele-film Hum TV 2014
 "Harkat May Barkat" eid day special tele-film Hum TV 2014
 "Anokhay Raqeeb" eid day special tele-film Hum TV 2014
 "Dil Tum Pay Aa Gya" eid day special tele-film Hum TV 2014
 "Pegham-E-haq" moharram special tele-film Hum TV 2014
 "Pehla Pyar" special tele-film Hum TV 2014
 "Socha Na Tha" mothers day special tele-film Hum TV 2014
 "Koi Malal Nahin" women's day special tele-film Hum TV 2014
 "Ek Dulhan Do barati" eid day special tele-film GEO TV 2014
 "Guroos" special tele-film Express Entertainment 2014
 "Umeed E Nau" independence Day tele-film Hum TV 2014
 "Zara Si Aurat" Women's Day special tele-film Hum TV 2015
 "Breaking News" special tele-film Express Entertainment 2015
 "Tamasha" Eid tele-film Hum TV 2015
 "Courtroom" Law Series Aaj Entertainment 2015 26 episodes 
 "New Love Ki Old Story" valentines tele-film Hum TV 2016
 "Dil jala hay" TV series Play Entertainment 2016 to present
 "Ustani Jee" on Hum TV (2018)
 "Choti Choti Batain" 2019 Hum TV
 "Kabhi Band Kabhi Baja" 2019 Express Entertainment

As an actor

Films 
 (2008) Kala Pul 
 (2018) Azad
 (2019) Kalasha in post
 (2019) The Window in post
 (2019) Baaji as Creative Producer

Television

As a producer
 "Mystery Theatre" series 2002–2004. Indus Media Group
 Ambulance series 2003–2004 Indus Media Group
 "Sayyad" telefilm 2004 AAJ TV
 "Jantay Jantay" telefilm 2005 Ary Digital
 Lahasil drama serial 2005 Hum TV
 "Aur Pyar Ho Gya" telefilm 2005 TVOne Global
 "Lillian" telefilm 2005 TVOne Global
 Lala Ki Film telefilm 2006 TVOne Global
 "Har khwahish pay dum Niklay" telefilm 2006 TVOne Global
 "Oh Farzana" telefilm 2006. Ary Digital
 "Dil Ki Madham Bolian" music video 2006 TVOne Global
 "Meri Awaaz" telefilm 2007 TVOne Global
 "The End" telefilm 2008 ARY Digital
 "Lateefa" telefilm 2008 ARY Digital
 RANI by Angeline Malik drama serial 2008.PTV
 "Woh Chaar" series 2010–2011 Hum TV
 "Run Zoella Run" telefilm 2010 ARY Digital
 "Piano Girl" Christmas Day special telefilm 2010 Hum TV
 "Najma Meri Jaan" telefilm 2012 Hum TV
 "Shinakht" 23rd march special telefilm 2012 Hum TV
 "Raja Banay Batein" telefilm 2012 Hum TV
 "Ghar Aay Mehman" eid day special telefilm 2012 Hum TV
 "Mehboob Movie walla" eid day special telefilm 2012 Hum TV
 "Dil Vallay Voti Lay Jain Gay" eid day special telefilm 2012 Hum TV
 "Mamma keh Mian" telefilm 2012 Express Entertainment
 "Jo Jeeta Woh Sikander" telefilm 2012 Express Entertainment
 "Haseena ChaalBaaz" Comedy Series 2012 Express Entertainment
 "Kitni Girhain Baqi Hain" TV series Hum TV 2011-2014 113 episodes
 "Susral Keh Rang Anokhay" TV series Hum TV 2012–2013
 Woh Horror serial 2013 on Hum TV
 "Safeer-e-ishq" moharram special tele-film Hum TV 2013
 "Kitni Girhain Baqi Hain" TV series Zee Zindagi 2011-to present
 "Aisa Jalay Jia" serial Hum TV 2013
 "Sirf Tum" Valentine's Day special tele-film Hum TV 2013
 "Aisa Dais Hay Mera" 23rd march special tele-film Hum TV 2013
 "Thora pya Zyada love" Valentine's Day special tele-film Hum TV 2014
 "Percham Pyar Ka" 23rd march special tele-film Hum TV 2014
 "Woh Dubarah" Second season of Woh horror serialHum TV 2014
 "Chupkay Chupkay" eid day special tele-film Hum TV 2014
 "Harkat May Barkat" eid day special tele-film Hum TV 2014
 "Anokhay Raqeeb" eid day special tele-film Hum TV 2014
 "Dil Tum Pay Aa Gya" eid day special tele-film Hum TV 2014
 "Pegham-E-haq" moharram special tele-film Hum TV 2014
 "Pehla Pyar" special tele-film Hum TV 2014
 "Socha Na Tha" mothers day special tele-film Hum TV 2014
 "Koi Malal Nahin" women's day special tele-film Hum TV 2014
 "Ek Dulhan Do barati" eid day special tele-film GEO TV 2014
 "Guroos" special tele-film Express Entertainment 2014
 "Umeed E Nau" independence Day tele-film Hum TV 2014
 "Zara Si Aurat" Women's Day special tele-film Hum TV 2015
 "Breaking News" special tele-film Express Entertainment 2015
 "May Chori Ho gai" special tele-film Express Entertainment 2014
 "Tamasha" Eid tele-film Hum TV 2015
 "Courtroom" Law Series Aaj Entertainment 2015 26 episodes 
 "New Love Ki Old Story" valentines tele-film Hum TV 2016
 "Dil jala hay" TV series Play Entertainment 2016 to present
 "Woh Phir Aayega" Third season of Woh horror serialHum TV 2017
 "Kabhi Band Kabhi Baja" Express 2018

As an anchor
 "Players Gold Leaf Series" (Spain) 2002. Pakistan Television Corporation
 "Black and White" 2001– 2003 Indus Media Group
 "Coca Cola" Host 2003
 "Curator" First Kara Film Festival 2002
 "Secrets and Success" 2005 ARY Digital
 "Not For Angels" 2007–2008 Indus Media Group
 "Hot And Sour" 2009 Indus Media Group
 "D For Directors" 2008–2010 A-Plus Entertainment

As a model
 (2006) Mohabbat si music video (Ali Haider) 
 (2005) Dewana music video (Ali Azmat) 
 (2007) Khashmakash music video (Huma Khawaja) 
 (2005) Paktel tele Communication
 (2010) Woh Chaar music video Hum TV
 (2011) Kitni Girhain Baqi Hain Hum TV
 (2012) Susral keg rang Anokhay Hum TV

As a writer
 "Mystery Theatre" Indus Media Group
 "The End" telefilm 2008 ARY Digital Network
 "Woh Chaar" series 2010 Hum TV
 "Kitni Girhain Baqi Hain" 2010–present Hum TV
 "Susral Ke Rung Anokhe" 2011–present Hum TV

Awards and nominations
Nominee Début of the year Lux Style Award 2002. (Black & White, talk show)
Nominee Best Television Play, Lux Style Award 2004. (Ambulance, drama series)
Best Host Indus TV Awards, 2003. (Black and White)
Nominee best Director The 1st Indus Drama Awards 2005, (Ambulance series)
Best Television Director (Satellite) Lux Style Award 2006. (Lahasil Drama Serial)
Nominee Best Television Actress (Satellite), Lux Style Award 2006. (Lahasil Drama serial)

Nominee Best play TVOne Global Awards 2006 (Lala Ki Film)
Best Director TVOne Global Awards 2006 (Lala ki Film)
Nominee Most Stylish Actress, Indus TV Awards 2007.
Nominee Best Supporting Actress PTV Awards 2010 (Sehra aur Samander)
Nominee Best Actress Pakistan Media Awards 2010 (Sehra aur Samander)
Nominee Best Television Actress 
(Terrestrial) Lux Style Award 2010. (Rani drama serial).
Nominee Best Television Play (Terrestrial) Lux Style Award 2010. (Rani drama serial)
Best producer 1st Hum Awards 2012 Kitni Girhain Baqi Hain
Nominee Best Director/producer telefilm 2013 2nd Hum Awards 
Nominee Best Director/producer telefilm 2014 3rd Hum Awards
Best Director/producer telefilm 2015 4th Hum Awards (tamasha)
Nominee Best Director/producer telefilm 2018 7th Hum Awards
Nominee Best Director series Pakistan Media Awards 2019
Nominee Best producer series Pakistan Media Awards 2019

Social work 
As an activist
 Launched campaign #inkaarkaro To create awareness on human rights in 2018 
 Launched campaign #mujhayjeenaydo #meriawaazsuno to create awareness and legislations against child abuse in 2020.

References

External links 
 
 

Living people
Pakistani television directors
Pakistani television actresses
1975 births
People from Islamabad
Pakistani film actresses
21st-century Pakistani actresses
Women television directors